Changjin-up Air Force Base (장진비행장) is a military airport in Changjin, South Hamgyong, North Korea.

Facilities 
The airfield has a single concrete runway, 16/34, which measures 9170 x 203 feet (2795 x 62 m).  It has a full-length offset taxiway at approximately 5.8 degrees off the runway heading, leading to dispersal and underground facilities. Where a squadron of IL-28 Russian jet bombers are based.

References 

 Landings database page 

Airports in North Korea
South Hamgyong